Ginigalgodage Ramba Ajit de Silva (born 12 December 1952), or Ajit de Silva, is a former Sri Lankan international cricketer, who played four Test matches and six One Day Internationals for Sri Lanka, bowling accurate slow left arm spin.

International career
He proved an important member of the national squad for several years until 1982/83, when he toured with the rebel Arosa Sri Lanka team to South Africa. Due to this, he was excluded from world cricket, along with the rest of the players on that tour. This effectively finished his first-class career, beginning in November 1973, in which he claimed 161 wickets (av 27.44).

He played a crucial part in Sri Lanka's first ODI victory on home soil – against England in 1982. Sri Lanka had batted first, setting England 216 to win, and Graham Gooch and Geoff Cook had set a good platform as the score moved to 109 for no loss. However, de Silva removed both openers (stumped by Mahes Goonatilleke), four players were run out, and England lost by three runs.

References

1952 births
Living people
Sri Lanka One Day International cricketers
Sri Lanka Test cricketers
Sri Lankan cricketers
Cricketers at the 1975 Cricket World Cup
Cricketers at the 1979 Cricket World Cup
Alumni of Dharmasoka College
People from Ambalangoda